Heaven on Earth is a 1927 German silent comedy film directed by Alfred Schirokauer and Reinhold Schünzel and starring Schünzel, Charlotte Ander, and Adele Sandrock. A prohibitionist inherits a cabaret called Heaven on Hearth.

The film's art direction was by Oscar Friedrich Werndorff.

Cast

References

Bibliography

External links

1927 films
Films of the Weimar Republic
German silent feature films
Films directed by Reinhold Schünzel
UFA GmbH films
German black-and-white films
German comedy films
1927 comedy films
Silent comedy films
1920s German films
1920s German-language films